Klaus Kynde Nielsen (born 13 April 1966) is a Danish former cyclist. He won the bronze medal in the Men's team pursuit at the 1992 Summer Olympics.

References 

1966 births
Living people
Cyclists at the 1992 Summer Olympics
Danish male cyclists
Olympic bronze medalists for Denmark
Olympic cyclists of Denmark
Olympic medalists in cycling
Medalists at the 1992 Summer Olympics
Sportspeople from Aarhus